The WUSA Inaugural Player Draft, held before Women's United Soccer Association's initial 2001 season, distributed players to the league's eight inaugural teams. The draft occurred on December 10 and 11, 2000.  This took place after each team was allocated three national team players and two foreign players.

Round 1

1. First American pick.

Round 2

Round 3

Round 4

1. San Diego got an additional "compensation pick" because Joy Fawcett, one of their allocated players, was pregnant.

Round 5

Round 6

1. Traded from the San Diego Spirit for a 6th round pick and a 2nd round pick in the February 2001 supplemental draft.  Soccer America noted that this trade apparently disrupted the subsequent order of the draft.

Round 7

Round 8

Round 9

Round 10

Round 11

Round 12

Round 13

Round 14

Round 15

Draft notes
The draft was preceded by an invitation-only combine held over five days at Florida Atlantic University.  Although over 500 players applied, only 198 were invited to take part in supervised training and scrimmages.  Around 40 of the players had previously been competing in the pro–am Women's Premier Soccer League (WPSL), while most of the others were competing at W-League level.

The draft assigned the rights of 15 players to each team.  Teams could contract up to five of the players immediately, to start promotional work in their home cities.  WUSA's vice president of legal affairs, Rob Kaler, had decided the draft order by randomly selecting envelopes containing each team's logo in a lottery.

In November 2000, WUSA's vice president of player relations, Lauren Gregg, secured five Chinese players after flying to China for delicate negotiations with a somewhat reluctant Chinese Football Association (CFA) and the players' clubs.  All five players went into the draft and were selected with five of the first six picks.  Top pick Sun Wen was in Rome on the second day of the draft, collecting her award as joint-FIFA Female Player of the Century.

Gregg had traversed the globe since May 2000, trying to sign elite players identified by WUSA commissioner Tony DiCicco.  She was not always successful: Norway's Marianne Pettersen accepted a competing offer from Europe's only professional club Fulham, while FFC Frankfurt blocked an approach for their German–American defender Steffi Jones.

American players who had found success overseas, including Colette Cunningham, Denise Reddy and Jill Rutten, reportedly attended the combine but were not selected in the draft.  Brazilian goalkeeper Andréia Suntaque and Dutch midfielder Nathalie Geeris were also in attendance but not picked.  Each team was restricted to four foreign players, including the two already allocated by the league.

As well as foreign players and combine attendees, college players in their senior year were eligible for the main draft, although a further supplemental draft – specifically for college players – was arranged for February 2001.

Many players, who were typically graduates from leading Universities, faced a substantial drop in salary, even if they made it on to a team's final 20-player roster.  A collective bargaining agreement between the players and league allowed a minimum annual wage of $25,000, beneath an average salary of $40,000.  After some deliberation, last pick Carmel Murphy decided not to take up her place at Bay Area CyberRays, in favor of going to medical school.

See also

 List of top-division football clubs in CONCACAF countries
 List of professional sports teams in the United States and Canada
 List of WUSA drafts
 2001 WUSA season

References

External links
 Inaugural WUSA Draft

2001
Draft